Ilmen is a rural locality (a selo) and the administrative center of Ilmenskoye Rural Settlement, Rudnyansky District, Volgograd Oblast, Russia. The population was 1,156 as of 2010. There are 13 streets.

Geography 
Ilmen is located in steppe, on the Khopyorsko-Buzulukskaya Plain, 17 km northwest of Rudnya (the district's administrative centre) by road. Rudnya is the nearest rural locality.

References 

Rural localities in Rudnyansky District, Volgograd Oblast